Andrew Bard Schmookler (born 1946) is an American author, public speaker, social commentator, and radio talk show host. He was the nominee of the Democratic Party for U.S. Representative for Virginia's 6th congressional district during the 2012 general election.

Early life and education
Schmookler graduated summa cum laude from Harvard College.  He did graduate study at the University of Chicago and Yale University.  He completed his doctoral work at the University of California at Berkeley and the Graduate Theological Union in a program created specially to accommodate his comprehensive theory of human history. In 1984, the International Society of Political Psychology awarded Schmookler the Erik H. Erickson prize for excellence and creativity in the field of political psychology for writing The Parable of the Tribes.  In 1985, Schmookler was selected by Esquire magazine as “one of the men and women under forty who are changing the nation.”

National security
At the Center for Strategic and International Studies in Washington, Schmookler helped with the analysis of possible future challenges for American policy-makers.  In a project with the Public Agenda Foundation, he interviewed the best minds in the country, in various related fields, on how the United States might best achieve security in an age of nuclear weapons.  In the 1990s, the United States Army hired Schmookler to assist on the formulation of a project on the prevention of biological terrorism.

Political and social commentary
Schmookler’s commentaries on social and political issues have appeared in local and national publications, including The Christian Science Monitor, The Baltimore Sun, the San Francisco Chronicle, and the Albuquerque Tribune. He has been a radio commentator for National Public Radio in Washington and in the Shenandoah Valley of Virginia.

His commentaries also appear regularly on such websites as Huffington Post, Daily Kos, Blue Virginia, Like the Dew, and OpedNews.

Public speaking
Schmookler has presented his ideas before audiences at Harvard University, St. John’s College in Annapolis, the University of Wisconsin, as Presidential Lecturer at the University of Montana and at the Woodrow Wilson International Center for Scholars. He has appeared as invited speaker at Findhorn in Scotland, the Isthmus Institute in Dallas, the Institute of Noetic Sciences in Washington and New York, and the Harmonia Mundi Conference in California.

2012 U.S. Representative campaign

Democratic nominee Schmookler challenged incumbent Republican nominee Bob Goodlatte.

Schmookler described “a moral crisis in America” that has manifested principally in the arena of political power.  He argued that a force has emerged on the political right that represents the convergence of three currents running through American history:  an imperialistic impulse, unbridled greed, and a form of religiosity that emphasizes division and conflict. He made his call to address this crisis in America the principal theme of his congressional race.

“Press the Battle” Campaign

Since the 2012 Election, Schmookler has been working on a campaign to get the national conversation to focus on what he regards as the central realities of our current national crisis. He identifies these as the two main components of that crisis: 1) that the Republican Party has been taken over by a destructive force; and 2) that the response from Liberal America to that threat has been woefully weak. He sees these as manifestations of a systemic cultural pathology which, though it manifests itself in different ways in different components of the American system, afflicts all the major organs of the American body politic.

Schmookler’s campaign to address this crisis he has given the title, “Press the Battle.” In its initial phase, it entails the publication of a series of articles that are intended to “light a fire in Liberal America.” It attempts to do this in two ways: 1) to draw a compelling portrait of the reality of that “destructive force” that has gained control of the political right, and 2) to address the sources of the blindness and weakness that have crippled Liberal America’s ability to protect the nation. Central among these sources are aspects of the worldview of Liberal/intellectual America that, Schmookler claims, cut people off from “the moral and spiritual passions that are at the core of our humanity.”

To that end, Schmookler offers “a naturalistic explanation of the origins and workings of constructive and destructive forces – “good” and “evil” – in the human system. This naturalistic explanation builds upon the ideas Schmookler developed in The Parable of the Tribes, Out of Weakness, and others of his works over the past more than forty years.

The motto of the campaign is “See the evil. Call it out. Press the battle.”

Published works
Andrew Bard Schmookler, The Parable of the Tribes: The Problem of Power in Social Evolution, University of California Press 1984, 
Andrew Bard Schmookler, Out of Weakness: Healing the Wounds That Drive Us to War, Bantam Books 1988, 
Andrew Bard Schmookler, Sowings and Reapings: The Cycling of Good and Evil in the Human System, Knowledge Systems 1989, 
Andrew Bard Schmookler, The Illusion of Choice: How the Market Economy Shapes Our Destiny, State University of New York Press 1993, 
Andrew Bard Schmookler, Fool's Gold: The Fate of Values in a World of Goods, HarperCollins 1993, 
Andrew Bard Schmookler, Debating the Good Society: A Quest to Bridge America's Moral Divide, MIT Press 1999, 

The Parable of the Tribes: The Problem of Power in Social Evolution (1984):  Based on Schmookler’s  doctoral work, this prize-winning book offers a parable of how civilizations developed.   The parable is that once some human tribe becomes habitually aggressive toward other tribes, all are eventually forced to adopt the ways of power.  The resulting destruction is not a reflection of human nature, but selection for the ways of power that has driven societies in ways people did not choose, but could not avoid.  Schmookler views the problem of power as a fundamental challenge for governance that must be dealt with in order to create humane and sustainable cultures.

Out of Weakness: Healing the Wounds that Drive Us to War (1988) is a study of ways that the above process has injured people and exacerbated problems of war and power.  It is a search for how people may become more whole and thus more capable of building peace.

The Illusion of Choice: How the Market Shapes Our Destiny (1993) is a study of what the market system can and cannot do to shape optimal outcomes for societies. It argues for a combination of free market forces, along with collective decision-making, to correct for market blind spots.

Debating the Good Society: A Quest for Bridging America’s Moral Divide (1999):  A fictional simulation of the kind of discussion that could heal rifts in a polarized society.  Various participants with a wide range of points of view—both liberal and conservative—enter into conversation so that the partial truths of each might be integrated.

Personal life
Schmookler lives in the Shenandoah Mountains of Virginia with his wife, April Moore.  They have three children.

References

External links 
Andy Schmookler’s page on HuffingtonPost.com
 

1946 births
Living people
American male non-fiction writers
American social sciences writers
American talk radio hosts
People from Shenandoah County, Virginia
Virginia Democrats
Harvard College alumni
University of California, Berkeley alumni
Candidates in the 2012 United States elections
21st-century American politicians
Graduate Theological Union alumni